d'Arenberg is an Australian wine company founded in 1912. All of its vineyards are located in South Australia's McLaren Vale wine region, although some of the wines they make are produced from grapes sourced from the Adelaide Hills wine region and other parts of the Fleurieu zone. It is now owned by the fourth generation of the Osborn family, headed by Chester Osborn. d'Arenberg are known for the quirky names of their wines, and their specialism in the vines of the Rhône valley. They also produce many of their wines in a traditional manner, using basket pressing for both reds and whites (the only winery in Australia to do so) and leaving the vast majority of the red wines unfiltered and unfined which can cause the wine to throw a sediment in bottle but leaves the flavour intact. The majority of their red wines are suitable for ageing as well as for drinking fairly young and even the cheaper wines show very well after a few years in bottle. Perhaps their best known wine is 'The Dead Arm Shiraz', made from fungus-infected shiraz grape vines.

In 2009 D'Arenberg joined Australian wine alliance First Families of Wine.

The Dead Arm Shiraz
The term "Dead Arm" comes from the disease Eutypa lata which is common in many older vineyards.  Eutypa Lata causes grape canker which slowly kills one of the branches of a vine.  This reduces the yield of the vine and intensifies the flavour. The grapes for the Dead Arm Shiraz come from these vines in the McLaren Vale region of South Australia. The wine is very rich and full bodied. In recent years, it has become somewhat popular due to good reviews in The Wine Spectator and other publications, as well as an increased worldwide interest in Australian wine.

d'Arenberg Cube

The d'Arenberg Cube is a five-storey building situated within the d'Arenberg vineyards on Osborn Road and was designed by Chief Winemaker Chester Osborn. Completed in 2017, the building contains a restaurant known as the d'Arenberg Cube Restaurant, a wine sensory room, a virtual fermenter, a 360-degree video room and the Alternate Realities Museum, which features numerous art installations.

See also
 Australian wine
 Australia's First Families of Wine

References

Notes

Bibliography

External links
 Australia's first families of Wine
 https://www.darenberg.com.au/

Australian wine
Wineries in McLaren Vale
Family-owned companies of Australia
Australian companies established in 1912
Food and drink companies established in 1912